John Lewis (born August 27, 1804) was a merchant and political figure in New Brunswick. He represented Albert County in the Legislative Assembly of New Brunswick over much of the period from 1852 to 1867.

He was born in Moncton, New Brunswick, the son of Ichabod Lewis and Rebecca Read, and educated there and in Halifax, Nova Scotia. In 1829, he married Lavinia Taylor; in 1864, Lewis married Mary Dickson, the widow of Captain William Bennett, after his first wife's death. He established himself as a merchant at Hillsborough in 1831. Lewis was a justice of the peace and served as a judge in the Inferior Court of Commons Pleas. He was also president of the Albert Railway for several years. In 1867, he was named to the Legislative Council of New Brunswick.

His son William James Lewis served in the provincial assembly and the Canadian House of Commons.

References 
The Canadian parliamentary companion, HJ Morgan (1869)
The Canadian biographical dictionary and portrait gallery of eminent and self-made men ... (1881)

1804 births
Year of death missing
Members of the Legislative Assembly of New Brunswick
Members of the Legislative Council of New Brunswick
People from Moncton
Colony of New Brunswick judges
Colony of New Brunswick people
Canadian justices of the peace